"Mistadobalina" is a song by American hip hop musician Del tha Funky Homosapien. It was released as the second single from his 1991 debut album, I Wish My Brother George Was Here. The single peaked at number 6 on the Billboard Hot Rap Songs chart, as well as number 55 on the Hot R&B/Hip-Hop Songs chart. In 2011, Willy Staley of Complex placed it at number 19 on the "50 Greatest Bay Area Rap Songs" list.

Production
The song draws inspiration and includes a vocal sample from The Monkees' song "Zilch" provided by Peter Tork, which began by repeating the name "Mr. Bob Dobalina." In a 2012 Rolling Stone article, Del said, "I just kind of conceptualized who Mr. Dobalina would be."

Track listing

Charts

Weekly charts

Year-end charts

References

External links
 

1991 debut singles
1991 songs
Del the Funky Homosapien songs
Elektra Records singles
Songs written by James Brown
Songs written by George Clinton (funk musician)
Songs written by Bootsy Collins
Songs written by Ice Cube
Songs written by Bernie Worrell
Songs written by Fred Wesley